Allanshaws is a place and farm off the B6362, in Lauderdale, by the Allan Water, in the parish of Melrose in the Scottish Borders area of Scotland, formerly part of Roxburghshire.

Nearby are Addinston, Galashiels, Killochyett, Lauder, Stow.

See also
List of places in the Scottish Borders
List of places in Scotland

References
 PSAS (1921) 'Donations to and purchases for the Museum and Library', Proc Soc Antiq Scot, vol.55, page 19

External links
RCAHMS record for Allanshaws
Scran image: Broadside regarding the sale of a farm in Allanshaws, Roxburghshire
The Scotsman, June 2009: "Perfect conditions in sheep rings"

Villages in the Scottish Borders